The Village of McFarland is located on Lake Waubesa adjacent to the southeast side of the City of Madison  in  Dane County. The population was 8,991 at the 2020 United States Census. McFarland has approximately 43.50 road miles, is slightly less than 5 square miles in total land area, and is part of the Madison Metropolitan Statistical Area.

U.S. Route 51 passes through McFarland and serves as the main connection point between the cities of Madison and Stoughton.  Its ZIP code is 53558. It is the tenth-most populous city in Dane County after Madison.

History
Several burial mounds from the Woodland period are known as the Lewis Mound Group in the village's Indian Mound Park.

McFarland was founded in 1856 by William H. McFarland. Early industries in the village included wheat and tobacco farming, harvesting winter ice and fish on nearby Lake Waubesa for rail shipment to markets in Chicago. Later, a small resort industry developed along the eastern shore of Lake Waubesa, including Edwards Park and Larson's Beach. After World War II, the village became a bedroom community for Madison. In the late 1950s, McFarland annexed the recently constructed petroleum tank farms north of the village, expanding the village's tax base. This allowed the McFarland School District to fund a new high school. In 1989 a major highway project on the nearby Madison highway called the Beltline made commuting to the village much easier and enabled rapid residential growth.

On June 17, 1992, an F3 tornado destroyed several dozen homes and injured several people in Waubesa Heights, a nearby housing development in the Town of Dunn, in the McFarland School District. At $18.0 million in damage this was the third-costliest tornado in Wisconsin's history behind the Oakfield and Barneveld F5s.

Geography
McFarland is located at  (43.018480, -89.291116).

It is bordered by Lake Waubesa to the west and Mud Lake to the south.

Time zone 
As in the rest of the state of Wisconsin, McFarland forms part of the Central Time Zone.

Demographics

2010 census
As of the census of 2010, there were 7,808 people, 3,079 households, and 2,201 families residing in the village. The racial makeup of the village was 94.4% White, 1.2% African American, 0.4% Native American, 1.7% Asian, 0.1% Pacific Islander, 0.7% from other races, and 1.5% from two or more races. Hispanic or Latino of any race were 2.3% of the population.

There were 3,079 households, of which 38.8% had children under the age of 18 living with them, 56.9% were married couples living together, 10.1% had a female householder with no husband present, 4.4% had a male householder with no wife present, and 28.5% were non-families. Of all households, 21.9% were made up of individuals, and 7.8% had someone living alone who was 65 years of age or older. The average household size was 2.54 and the average family size was 2.96.

The median age in the village was 39.7 years. 26.9% of residents were under the age of 18; 5.6% were between the ages of 18 and 24; 26% were from 25 to 44; 31.2% were from 45 to 64; and 10.3% were 65 years of age or older. The gender makeup of the village was 49.0% male and 51.0% female.

Education 
The McFarland School District serves the village of McFarland. It operates Conrad Elvehjem Early Learning Center (K), McFarland Primary School (grades 1–2), Waubesa Intermediate School (3–5), Indian Mound Middle School (6–8) and McFarland High School, which is accredited by the AdvancED commission.

The McFarland School District has consistently scored above the state average on standardized tests. In addition, the district has received a number of accolades and awards for its educational programs and initiatives.

Government 

McFarland is governed by a village board consisting of a president and six trustees. The president and trustees are elected to two-year terms during spring elections. The Village President of McFarland is Carolyn Clow.

McFarland has a full-time village administrator, who is responsible for the administration of the village government in accordance with the policies established by the Village Board. Other city officers consist of Village Clerk, treasurer, municipal judge, police chief and fire chief.

Events
Summer Concert Series

The village hosts a summer concert series in McDaniel Park, featuring live music from local and regional bands.

Farmers Market

The McFarland Farmers' Market is held on Saturday mornings from May through October at the McFarland Village Center. The market features fresh produce, baked goods, crafts, and other items from local vendors.

McFarland Community Festival

Since 1985 McFarland has held a festival on the fourth weekend every September.  The festival has carnival rides, train rides, a parade, and many competitions.

Winter Wonderland in the Village

In the first week of December, Winter Wonderland in the Village (formerly known as Christmas in the Village) takes place. Among the events are Open Houses, Scavenger Hunts, Carriage Rides, Santa visits, and a parade.

Transportation 
Located just south of US 12, Madison's "Beltline Highway," McFarland is four minutes from Interstate 90, 12 minutes from the Wisconsin State Capitol, and 12 minutes from the University of Wisconsin.

McFarland is served by the Dane County Regional Airport, which is located 12 miles north of the village.  McFarland is served by two taxicab companies (Union Taxi and Madison Taxi), as well as several companies that provide specialized transportation for persons with disabilities. Additionally, Uber and Lyft are available in McFarland.

Railroad 
The village is crossed by the Wisconsin and Southern railroad line.

Bicycle 
McFarland offers several biking trails, including the Lower Yahara River Trail. The approximately 2.5 miles of this trail link Madison, WI to McFarland, WI via an off-road trail sysystem. Among its features is North America's longest inland boardwalk bridge.

Municipal Services

Fire Department & Emergency Medical Services 

McFarland has a municipal combination fire department, McFarland Fire Rescue, which covers an area of 14 square miles, including the village and the surrounding area. Firefighting and paramedic-level emergency medical services are provided by McFarland Fire Rescue. With its origins dating back to 1908, the department currently consists of 68 paid-on-call members who work external jobs and nine career staff members.

Law Enforcement 
The   Village   has   a   full-service   Police   Department,   that   provides   law enforcement services 24 hours a day.  The McFarland Police Department is staffed by a  Chief,  Lieutenant, 3 Sergeants, Detective,  Investigator,  and  10 Officers as well as 2 non-sworn administrative staff.  The McFarland Police Department has an  extensive  outreach  program, School Resource  Officer,  Community Service Officer, and K-9 Officer.

Public Library 
The E.D. Locke Public Library serves the village. It is part of the South Central Library System. Services include youth programming, adult programming, reference, database, technical services, and circulation.

Media 
Further information: List of Wisconsin magazines and List of Wisconsin daily newspapers

Madison television, radio, print, and other media outlets serve McFarland. The village is served by one local weekly newspaper, the McFarland Thistle. McFarland has a local public-access TV station, WMCF.

Economy 
The McFarland School District and US Oil are two of the most significant employers in the village. Many residents commute to jobs in Madison.

Attractions 

McFarland Historical Museum

The McFarland Historical Museum is maintained by members of the McFarland Historical Society, which is dedicated to preserving and promoting the history and heritage of the Village of McFarland. Each Sunday from Memorial Day to September, the Museum and Log Cabin are open to the public from 1:00 p.m. to 4:00 p.m.

Larson House Museum

The Larson House is a restored Queen Anne style Victorian home built in 1898 by E.N. Edwards.  The home is open for tours on Sunday afternoons from 1 to 4 pm, Memorial Day to Labor Day.

Notable people
 Realf Ottesen Brandt, Lutheran minister
 Al Epperly, MLB player
 Conrad Elvehjem, biochemist
 Brad Fischer, adviser for the Pittsburgh Pirates
 Dominic Fumusa, actor
 Matt and Becca Hamilton, Olympic curlers
 Doris Hanson, Wisconsin politician
 Robert L. Hunt, wildlife biologist and expert on trout
 Steve Lacy, 1980 and 1984 Olympic runner, University of Wisconsin Hall of Fame
 Helmar Lewis, Wisconsin State Senator
 Theodore G. Lewis, jurist
 Nina Roth, Olympic curler
 Jana Schneider, actress and journalist
 Barbara Thompson, Wisconsin Superintendent of Public Instruction

References

External links
 
 McFarland School District
 McFarland Chamber of Commerce
 McFarland Historical Society
 Sanborn fire insurance map: 1894

Villages in Wisconsin
Villages in Dane County, Wisconsin
Madison, Wisconsin, metropolitan statistical area
Populated places established in 1856
1856 establishments in Wisconsin